Augusto Gerosa (1 October 1909 – 7 November 1982) was an Italian ice hockey player. He competed in the men's tournament at the 1936 Winter Olympics.

References

1909 births
1982 deaths
Italian ice hockey players
Olympic ice hockey players of Italy
Ice hockey players at the 1936 Winter Olympics
Ice hockey people from Milan